Kajiyazawa Dam is a gravity dam located in Gunma Prefecture in Japan. The dam is used for power production. The catchment area of the dam is 686.8 km2. The dam impounds about 3  ha of land when full and can store 257 thousand cubic meters of water. The construction of the dam was started on 1927 and completed in 1929.

References

Dams in Gunma Prefecture